Tara Wilson may refer to:
Tara Wilson (pageant titleholder), former Miss West Virginia USA
Tara Wilson (Boston Legal), a fictional character from The Practice and its spinoff Boston Legal